Dave Klein (born May 31, 1979) is an American musician and punk rock bass player from Edmond, Oklahoma, United States. He plays bass for Screeching Weasel and Oklahoma Skate-Punk band They Stay Dead. Former bands include Black Flag, Good For You, The Proctologists, Bi-Products, P.D.B, From Parts Unknown, Jettison, Wretch Like Me (Owned & Operated Recordings 1997-2002), Euclid Crash, Bristol Park, On Again, and American Ruse.

References

External links 

They Stay Dead

1979 births
Living people
American punk rock bass guitarists
Hardcore punk musicians
Guitarists from Oklahoma
American male bass guitarists
Screeching Weasel members
21st-century American bass guitarists
21st-century American male musicians